Buccinum coronatum is a species of sea snail, a marine gastropod mollusk in the family Buccinidae, the true whelks.

Nomenclature
The species Buccinum coronatum Golikov, 1980, is valid, but the name is preoccupied several times. The name is thus invalid, but it has no synonym or replacement name. One is needed. .
 Buccinum coronatum Bruguière, 1789: synonym of Nassarius coronatus (Bruguière, 1789)
 Buccinum coronatum Gmelin, 1791: synonym of Nassa serta (Bruguière, 1789)
 Buccinum coronatum Quoy & Gaimard, 1833: synonym of Nassarius distortus (A. Adams, 1852)

Description

Distribution

References

Buccinidae
Gastropods described in 1980